Francisco Pizarro  (c. 1471–1541) was a Spanish conquistador who led an expedition that conquered the Inca Empire.

Pizarro may also refer to:

People with the surname
The Pizarro brothers, siblings of Francisco Pizarro who gained fame as Spanish conquistadors
Gonzalo Pizarro  (1510–1548), co-governor of Peru, led disastrous expedition into the Amazon to find El Dorado
Hernando Pizarro (fl. 1508–1578), co-governor of Peru
Juan Pizarro (conquistador) (c. 1511 – 1536), half-brother of Francisco, co-governor of Peru, killed during an Inca rebellion
Gonzalo Pizarro y Rodríguez (1446–1522), Spanish Captain who participated in several campaigns in Italy
José Alfonso Pizarro, Marquis del Villar (1689–1762), Spanish naval officer and colonial administrator
Ramón García de León y Pizarro (1745-1815), Spanish military officer and administrator
Francisco Xavier de Luna Pizarro (1780–1855), Peruvian priest and politician who briefly served as Interim President of Peru twice in 1822 and 1833
Francisco Pizarro Martínez (1787–1840), Mexican diplomat who served as Envoy Extraordinary and Minister Plenipotentiary of Mexico to the United States 
Gustavo Silva Pizarro (1884—1960), Chilean lawyer, political scientist 
Carlos Muñoz Pizarro (1913–1976), Chilean botanist
Harold Bedoya Pizarro (1938–2017), general and commander of the Colombian National Army
Palmenia Pizarro González (born 1941), Chilean singer
Carlos Pizarro Leongómez (1951–1990), the fourth commander of the Colombian guerrilla group 19th of April Movement
Artur Pizarro (born 1968), Portuguese classical pianist
David Pizarro (born 1979), Chilean football (soccer) player
Claudio Pizarro (born 1978), Peruvian football (soccer) player
Francisco Pizarro (footballer) (born 1989), Chilean football (soccer) player
Jaime Pizarro (born 1964), Chilean footballer
Jorge Pizarro Soto (born 1952), Chilean politician
Juan Pizarro Navarrete (1945–2022), Spanish physician and politician
Luis Pizarro (boxer) (born 1962), Puerto Rican boxer
Palmenia Pizarro (born 1941), Chilean singer
Manuel Pizarro Moreno (born 1951), economist, Spanish jurist, Lawyer of the State, exchange agent and stock exchange
Rodolfo Pizarro (born 1994), Mexican football (soccer) player 
Manuel Pizarro (politician) (born 1964), Portuguese politician
Yolanda Arroyo Pizarro (born 1970), award-winning Puerto Rican novelist, short story writer and essayist
Rogelio Pizarro (born 1979), Puerto Rican track and field athlete
Guido Pizarro (born 1990), Argentine football (soccer) player
Eduardo Pizarro Leongómez,  Ambassador of Colombia to the Netherlands

In fiction
Avalo Pizarro, a member of the Blackbeard Pirates in One Piece
Don Pizarro, the prison governor in Fidelio

Other uses
Pizarro (play), a 1799 dramatic tragedy by Richard Brinsley Sheridan, based on August von Kotzebue's Die Spanier in Peru
Pizarro (brigantine), Chilean ship commanded by Francisco Hudson
ASCOD armoured fighting vehicle family, known in Spain as Pizarro and in Austria as Ulan

See also
Comet Elst-Pizarro, an astronomical object first reported in 1979
Pesaro
Pissarro (surname)
Bizarro